Kazem Mohammadi (23 August 1973 – 3 August 2021) was an Iranian professional futsal player.

Biography
Mohammadi was a winger, and a former member of the Iran national futsal team.

He played in 2004 FIFA Futsal World Championship in Chinese Taipei.

Death
After struggling over a week with COVID-19, Mohammadi died at Ghaem Hospital in Karaj on 3 August 2021, aged 47.

Honours 
Iran
 AFC Futsal Championship (7): 1999, 2000, 2001, 2003, 2004, 2007, 2008

Individual  
 AFC Futsal Championship top scorer: 1999 (18 goals)

References

 Futsal Planet

External links 
 Profile at lnfs.es (in Spain)
 RSSSF – AFC Futsal Championship

1973 births
2021 deaths
People from Ray, Iran
Iranian men's futsal players
Futsal forwards
Tam Iran Khodro FSC players
Persepolis FSC players
Dabiri FSC players
Deaths from the COVID-19 pandemic in Iran